Organothiophosphates or organophosphorothioates are a subclass of organophosphorus compounds. Many are used as pesticides, some have medical applications, and some are used as oil additives.  They generally have the chemical formula (RO)3PS, [(RO)2P(S)O]−, R(RO)2PS, etc.

Oligonucleotide phosphorothioates (OPS) are modified oligonucleotides where one of the oxygen atoms in the phosphate moiety is replaced by sulfur. These compounds are the basis of antisense therapy, e.g., the drugs fomivirsen (Vitravene), Oblimersen, Alicaforsen, and Mipomersen (Kynamro).

Further examples of these include:
 Diazinon
 Fenitrothion
 Fenthion
 Thiotepa

Variants with P=S double bonds were developed as insecticides because of their reduced mammalian toxicity. The phosphorothioate P=S bond is converted to the toxic P=O bond in the target insect. Similar oxidative conversion in mammals is slower, conferring lower toxicity in mammals.

Structure and chemical synthesis
Generally these compounds feature tetrahedral phosphorus(V) centers. Classically, thiophosphates would include a P=S double bond as illustrated by malathion. The terminology is used loosely and thiophosphates include P-S single bonds as illustrated by the drug amifostine. P–S single bonds can be generated through a variety of approaches, starting from thiols, disulfides, sulfinic acids as sulfur sources and various P(III) and P(V) coupling partners. PS–C bonds can also be formed through many comparable approaches, usually by alkylating a free phosphorous thioate anion or thioic acid.

They are conceptually derived from the inorganic thiophosphates (PO4−xS). In fact, many are prepared via the intermediacy diorganodithiophosphoric acids, which are prepared by treating phosphorus pentasulfide with alcohols:
P2S5 + 4 ROH → 2 (RO)2PS2H + H2S
Dimethyl dithiophosphoric acid and diethyl dithiophosphoric acid are obtained in this way. The former is a precursor to malathion.

References

External links